The Slava class, Soviet designation Project 1164 Atlant, is a class of guided-missile cruisers designed and constructed in the Soviet Union for the Soviet Navy, and currently operated by the Russian Navy.

Design and history
The design started in the late 1960s, based around use of the P-500 Bazalt missile. The cruiser was intended as a less expensive conventionally powered alternative to the nuclear-powered s. All are now armed with P-1000 Vulkan AShM missiles, developed in the late 1970s to late 1980s. There was a long delay in this programme, while the problems with the Bazalt were resolved.

These ships acted as flagships for numerous task forces. All ships were built at the 61 Kommunar yard in Mykolaiv (Nikolaev), Ukrainian SSR. BPK), constructed at the same shipyard and appears to be built on a stretched version of the Kara-class hull.

The Slava class was initially designated BLACKCOM 1 (Black Sea Combatant 1) and then designated the Krasina class for a short period until Slava was observed at sea. The SS-N-12 launchers are fixed facing forward at around 8° elevation with no reloads available. As there was nothing revolutionary about the design of the class, western observers felt they were created as a hedge against the failure of the more radical Kirov class. The helicopter hangar deck is located a half deck below the landing pad with a ramp connecting the two.

Originally ten ships were planned, but with the collapse of the Soviet Union, only three were completed. A fourth vessel was launched, but final construction remains incomplete, and the ship has not been commissioned into service.

After the dissolution of the Soviet Union, the three finished ships commenced service in the Russian Navy, while the uncompleted fourth vessel, renamed , had its ownership transferred to Ukraine. Efforts have been made to complete and update the unfinished ship. In 2010, Ukrainian president Viktor Yanukovych stated that Russia and Ukraine would work together on the project.

Russia has also expressed interest in purchasing the vessel, which Ukraine had previously offered for sale. However, as of early 2011, no final agreement had been concluded between the two countries. 

The Russian Navy had plans to extensively upgrade all of their Slava-class vessels during the 2010s; completing work on Ukraina may have served as a test-bed for this. As of April 2022, the fourth hull remains afloat at a Ukrainian shipyard, uncompleted.
One of the vessels, Moskva, sank in the Black Sea on 13 April 2022 following an explosion during the Russian invasion of Ukraine. Ukrainian military officials claimed this was the result of a Neptune missile strike by Ukraine, while Russia claimed a violent storm caused an explosion of the warship's ammunition, resulting in the sinking.

Ships

See also
 , United States
 Type 055 destroyer, China PLA Navy

References

External links

 
 
 
 
 

Cruiser classes
 
Ship classes of the Russian Navy